The Women's Association of Siam later known as Thai Women's Association of Thailand, was a women's organization in Thailand, founded in 1932.

It was the first women's association dedicated to women's rights in Thailand.

Its purpose was to unite women and women's learning, and it also provided courses for women.

References

Organizations established in 1932
1932 establishments
Women's rights organizations
Women's organizations based in Thailand
1932 in Siam
Feminism in Thailand
History of women in Thailand